The J.K. Miller Homestead in Glacier National Park near Big Prairie, Montana, United States, was built in 1909.  It was listed on the National Register of Historic Places in 1988.  The listing included three contributing buildings and one other contributing structure.

According to a 1986 report, the homestead is "a well preserved historic homestead complex, despite its abandonment since the 1930s."

It includes a large, dovetail-notched, log privy that "is notable for its craftsmanship and good preservation" and an "outstanding"  by  log horse barn.

References

Houses in Flathead County, Montana
Houses completed in 1909
Houses on the National Register of Historic Places in Montana
National Register of Historic Places in Flathead County, Montana
National Register of Historic Places in Glacier National Park
1909 establishments in Montana
Log buildings and structures on the National Register of Historic Places in Montana
Unused buildings in Montana